Brian Higgins (1930 –1965) was an Irish poet, mathematician and professional rugby league footballer.
‘Born at Batley in 1930, bored at Bradford in 1940, in 1950 he had an affair with the gamma function. He was educated in 1960 at the "York Minster", Soho.’ 
Thus states the biographical note on the endpaper of Brian Higgins's first book of poems, "The Only Need". Brian Higgins died in 1965, before his third book of poems "The Northern Fiddler" appeared. In an introduction to this book the poet George Barker wrote that Higgins "had perceived that the secret at the heart of affairs constituted the most ingenious practical joke, which only a man who was at one and the same time a mathematician and a poet of sentiment could start functioning for the amusement and edification of all concerned."
Higgins called himself "a realist who wished to be romantic".

Biography

He was born in Batley, Yorkshire. He was a gifted mathematician and, briefly, a professional rugby league footballer. He then became a schoolteacher; but soon abandoned this for a literary career, at which he was also unsuccessful. After living from hand to mouth for some years, he died of a rare heart disease. As a poet he first came to attention through X (magazine) and it was one of X's editors, Patrick Swift, who first put him up - or as David Wright says, 'put up with him' - in London. Wright amusingly goes on to recall: "More than once Swift and I had to sit on his head to stop him writing furious letters full of impossible pecuniary demands to whichever was the unfortunate publisher of the moment. Higgins would say, with impenetrable logic: 'Look, it's going to cost them £500 to publish these rubbishy poems. Why don't they give me the £500 and not publish?' "

Martin Seymour-Smith says that "in some twenty poems, including ‘Snow and Poetry’ and ‘A Slight Unease’, he achieved a surprisingly precise, elegant and metaphysical voice that might well have been developed had he lived."

And David Wright on Higgins in Poetry Review: "Martin Seymour-Smith remarks in his Guide to Modern World Literature, ‘a hit-or-miss poet . . . who had too little time to exercise control over his considerable intelligence’. But one or two of his poems sustain a comparison with Blake, that else might seem fatuous, made by a reviewer of his last and posthumous book in the New Statesman (which of course never published a line by Higgins while he was alive; despite or because of the abusive letters Higgins used to hurl at its editor)...Useless to speculate what he might have done or been; but with his going there closed a window which would have let fresh air into the hothouse. Some of us might have felt the draught."

Work 

The Only Need, Abelard-Schuman, London (1960)
 Notes While Travelling, London: Longmans, (1964)
The Northern Fiddler, London: Methuen & Co. Ltd (1966)

References

Reference and further reading 

X (magazine): X a Quarterly Review. Volume 2 Number 2, Barrie & Rockliff, London (1961)
Essays. 1st UK in dj.,BARKER, George, MacGibbon & Kee, London, 1970,
 Indian Uni
Anthony Cronin 
 Poem for Patrick Swift, by Higgins: Patrick Swift 1927-83 (Gandon Editions, Kinsale, 1993)
 Poetry Foundation
 Poetry Magazines, David Wright, Another Part of the Wood
 Irish Writers
 Poetry Mag
 Oxford Journals

1930 births
1965 deaths
20th-century English poets
English rugby league players
People from Batley
Rugby league players from Batley